De Bilt is a municipality and town in the province of Utrecht, Netherlands. De Bilt houses the headquarters of the Royal Netherlands Meteorological Institute (KNMI).

It is the ancestral home and namesake for the prominent Vanderbilt family of the United States.

Population centres 
The municipality of De Bilt consists of the following cities, towns, villages and/or districts: Bilthoven, De Bilt, Groenekan, Hollandsche Rading, Maartensdijk, Westbroek.

Topography

Dutch Topographic map of the municipality of De Bilt, June 2015

Notable people 

 Nicolaas van Nieuwland (1510 in Maartensdijk – 1580) Bishop of Haarlem and abbot of Egmond Abbey 1562 to 1569. 
 Joan Gideon Loten (1710 in Groenekan – 1789) worked in the Dutch East India Company, the 29th Governor of Zeylan
 The Vanderbilt family, prominent in the USA during the Gilded Age, has its name from the town, meaning 'from De Bilt'.
 Johan Beyen (1897 in Bilthoven – 1976) a politician, helped create the European Economic Community
 Auke Bloembergen (1927 in De Bilt – 2016) a jurist, justice at the Supreme Court of the Netherlands 1979 to 1993
 Els Borst (1932 – 2014 in Bilthoven) a Dutch politician, academic and physician
 Ad Donker (1933 in Bilthoven – 2002) a pioneering publisher of social critical works in South Africa
 Anne Sjerp Troelstra (1939 in Maartensdijk – 2019) a maths professor the Institute for Logic, Language and Computation at the University of Amsterdam. 
 Madelon Hooykaas (born 1942 in Maartensdijk) a video artist, photographer and film maker
 Madelon Vriesendorp (born 1945 in Bilthoven) an artist, co-founded of the Office of Metropolitan Architecture
 Erik van der Wurff (1945 in De Bilt – 2014) a pianist, composer, arranger, producer and conductor
 Frederik de Groot (born 1946 in Bilthoven) a Dutch actor and TV spokesman for ING Direct Canada
 Thomas von der Dunk (born 1961) a cultural historian, writer and columnist; raised in Bilthoven
 Albert Schram (born 1964 in De Bilt) the Vice Chancellor of the Papua New Guinea University of Technology
 Bas Haring (born 1968 in De Bilt) a writer of popular science and children's literature and TV presenter
 Jetske van den Elsen (born 1972 in De Bilt) a Dutch female television presenter

Sport 
 John Blankenstein (1949 in De Bilt – 2006) a football referee and gay rights activist
 Ingrid van der Elst (born 1955 in Bilthoven) a former sportswoman in cricket and field hockey
 Hans van Breukelen (born 1956) a former football goalkeeper with 511 club caps, grew up in De Bilt
 Martijntje Quik (born 1973 in De Bilt) a former coxswain, silver medallist at the 2000 Summer Olympics
 Joost Broerse (born 1979 in De Bilt) a Dutch former footballer with 448 club caps
 Lisa Westerhof (born 1981 in De Bilt) a sailor, competed at the 2004 and 2012 Summer Olympics 
 Thierry Brinkman (born 1995 in Bilthoven) a Dutch field hockey player

Gallery

References

External links 

Official Website

 
Municipalities of Utrecht (province)
Populated places in Utrecht (province)